Spanish Fork is a city in Utah County, Utah, United States. It is part of the Provo–Orem Metropolitan Statistical Area. The 2020 census reported a population of 42,602. Spanish Fork, Utah is the 20th largest city in Utah based on official 2017 estimates from the US Census Bureau.

Spanish Fork lies in the Utah Valley, with the Wasatch Range to the east and Utah Lake to the northwest. I-15 passes the northwest side of the city. Payson is approximately six miles to the southwest, Springville lies about four miles to the northeast, and Salem is approximately 4.5 miles to the south.

History
Spanish Fork was settled in 1851 by members of the Church of Jesus Christ of Latter-day Saints as part of the Mormon Pioneers' settlement of Utah Territory. Its name derives from a visit to the area by two Franciscan friars from Spain, Silvestre Vélez de Escalante and Francisco Atanasio Domínguez in 1776, who followed the stream down Spanish Fork canyon with the objective of opening a new trail from Santa Fe, New Mexico, to the Spanish missions in California, along a route later followed by fur trappers. They described the area inhabited by Native Americans as having "spreading meadows, where there is sufficient irrigable land for two good settlements. [...] Over and above these finest of advantages, it has plenty of firewood and timber in the adjacent sierra which surrounds it—many sheltered spots, waters, and pasturages, for raising cattle and sheep and horses."

In 1851, some settlers led by William Pace set up scattered farms in the Spanish Fork bottom lands and called the area the Upper Settlement. However, a larger group congregated at what became known as the Lower Settlement just over a mile northwest of the present center of Spanish Fork along the Spanish Fork river. In December 1851, Stephen Markham, who was severely wounded outside Carthage Jail in Carthage, Illinois while attempting to defend Joseph Smith and other church leaders from a mob in 1844, became the president of the first church congregation (branch) at the Lower Settlement.

In 1852, Latter-day Saints founded a settlement called Palmyra west of the historic center of Spanish Fork. George A. Smith supervised the laying out of a townsite, including a temple square in that year. A fort and a school were built at the Palmyra site in 1852. With the onset of the Walker War in 1853, most of the farmers in the region who were not yet in the Palmyra fort moved in. Some of the people did not like this site and so moved to a different site at the mouth of Spanish Fork Canyon, where they built a structure they called "Fort St. Luke".

Between 1855 and 1860, the arrival of pioneers from Iceland made Spanish Fork the first permanent Icelandic settlement in the United States. The city also lent its name to the 1865 Treaty of Spanish Fork, where the Utes were forced by an Executive Order of President Abraham Lincoln to relocate to the Uintah Basin.

Climate
Spanish Fork has a dry-summer continental climate (Köppen: Dsa) with cold, snowy winters and hot, dry summers.

Government
Spanish Fork has a council-manager form of government. Seth Perrins is the current city manager, and Tyler Jacobson is the assistant city manager.

The current mayor, Mike Mendenhall was elected in the November 10, 2021 general election. The members of the city council are: Chad Argyle, Stacy Beck, Brandon Gordon and Shane Marshall.

Demographics and economy

As of the 2010 census, there were 34,691 people, 9,069 households, and 7,885 families residing in the city. The population density was 2,252.7 people per square mile (871.6/km). There were 9,440 housing units, at an average density of 613.0 per square mile (237.2/km). The racial makeup of the city was 90.9% White, 0.4% African American, 0.5% Native American, 0.6% Asian, 0.7% Pacific Islander, 4.4% some other race, and 2.5% from two or more races. Hispanic or Latino of any race were 10.6% of the population. As for ages, the population was quite young with 40.9% being under the age of 18, 53.6% aged 18–64 and 5.5% over the age of 65.

At the 2000 census, the median income for a household in the city was $62,805, and the median income for a family was $64,909. The per capita income for the city was $17,162. About 4.3% of families and 6.2% of the population were below the poverty line.

Spanish Fork has a predominantly LDS population. There are seventy-four LDS wards in nine stakes in the southern Utah Valley and a temple, the Payson Utah Temple, which opened in June 2015. The majority of residents are Members of The Church of Jesus Christ of Latter-day Saints just like all of Utah County.

There are other churches in town: the Presbyterian Church established a church and mission day school in 1882. The school functioned until the state school system was inaugurated in the early part of the twentieth century. Today there are nine public elementary schools, two intermediate, and two high schools of the Nebo School District.

A Lutheran church, established by immigrants from Iceland, was built on the east bench of Spanish Fork. There is also the Faith Baptist Church, a Baptist congregation.

A Roman Catholic church serves the Catholics of southern Utah Valley; many happen to be of Italian descent (see Utah Italians), Hispanics, Filipino Americans, and some Greek Catholics from the Balkans.

ISKCON, the international society of Krishna Consciousness, have built a temple in Spanish Fork, run by Caru Das, the temple priest. Indian Americans form a small but noticeable community in the Spanish Fork-Provo area (especially in the neighboring town of Springville).

In Utah Valley's historical settlement by immigrants, Scandinavians (most notably Icelanders); as well as Swiss people; Spanish Americans, Hispanics or Latinos; English Americans, Irish Americans and Scottish Americans are prevalent ethnocultural groups in Spanish Fork, and the nearby towns of Salem and Payson.

Schools

In 1862, Spanish Fork built its first school house. That one room edifice served the city's educational needs for nearly 50 years. In 1910, Spanish Fork built the Thurber School on Main Street. Although it's not used for daily K-12 classes anymore, it still functions as a city office building. Today, Spanish Fork is served by the Nebo School District. Public schools in this district within Spanish Fork include the following:

 Spanish Fork High School
 Maple Mountain High School
 Landmark High School (alternative school)
 Spanish Fork Junior High School
 Diamond Fork Middle School (formerly known as Diamond Fork Junior High School)
 Brockbank Elementary
 Canyon Elementary
 Larsen Elementary
 Park Elementary
 Rees Elementary
 Riverview Elementary School
 East Meadows Elementary
 Sierra Bonita Elementary
 Maple Ridge Elementary
In addition, there is a private girls school, the New Haven School, and a K-12 charter school, the American Leadership Academy.

Events
Spanish Fork City hosts five large-scale events each year: Fiesta Days, Icelandic Days, the Harvest Moon Hurrah, the Festival of Lights, and the Festival of Colors.

Icelandic Days
The Icelandic Association of Utah was founded in 1897 and hosts Iceland Days every year. The association picked June because Icelandic Independence Day, or National Day, is June 17.

Spanish Fork was the first Icelandic settlement in the United States, after Icelanders who joined the Church of Jesus Christ were expelled from that country, according to association spokesman Glenn Grossman. Although other nationalities helped found the town, under colonizer Brigham Young, Icelanders kept their identity and celebrate it with their culture every year during the three-day event.

Harvest Moon Hurrah
The Harvest Moon Hurrah is sponsored by the Spanish Fork Arts Council and takes place on a Saturday in September closest to the date of the full moon. Activities include children's crafts and activities, a giant paint-it-yourself mural, storyteller, old-fashioned family photos, caricature artist, clown and balloon animals, hay rides with live bluegrass band, and live entertainment. The 2009 Hurrah was headlined by Peter Breinholt, a local musician.

Fiesta Days
Each year Spanish Fork hosts the "Fiesta Days". The event is held every July, and is centered around the Pioneer Day Celebration. There are a number of entertainment events, including a rodeo, craft fair, parade, duck race, and a fireworks show on the 24th.

Festival of Colors
The Sri Sri Radha Krishna Temple (erected by Christopher Warden, an International Society for Krishna Consciousness follower)  celebrates Holi and is known for the  Festival of Colors where thousands of people gather from all over the country.

Alternative energy
In September 2008, the Spanish Fork Wind Project was completed. This project, a 9-turbine wind energy project, can produce up to 18.9 megawatts at full production, and the nine turbines can power up to 6,000 typical homes. It is a utility-scale wind farm producing electricity from wind power.

Notable people
 Stephen M. Studdert, Advisor to U.S. Presidents George Bush, Ronald Reagan, and Gerald Ford
 Gail Halvorsen, U.S. Air Force candy bomber
 D. Elden Beck, educator
 Kate B. Carter, Utah pioneer historian
 Zebedee Coltrin, Utah pioneer
 Lucky Blue Smith, male model
 Kaycee Feild, bareback bronc rider
 Isaac Asiata, football player
 Scott Brumfield, football player
 Hefa Leone Tuita, dancer

See also

 List of cities and towns in Utah
 Icelandic heritage in Spanish Fork, Utah

References

External links

 

 
Cities in Utah
Populated places established in 1850
Provo–Orem metropolitan area
Icelandic-American history
Cities in Utah County, Utah